Philippe François Armand Marie de Noailles, Duc de Mouchy, Prince-Duc de Poix (17 April 1922 – 28 February 2011) was a cadet of the French ducal house of Noailles (created dukes and peers of France in 1663 by Louis XIV), and second in succession to the senior title. He was the eldest son of Henri-Antoine-Marie de Noailles, Duc de Mouchy, Prince-Duc de Poix, and of Marie de La Rochefoucauld. Following his marriage to Joan Dillon, he became managing director of Domaine Clarence Dillon. Together, the couple acquired Château La Mission Haut-Brion, Château Laville Haut-Brion and Château La Tour Haut-Brion.

Family
Philippe was married twice. His first wife was Diane Rose Anne Marie de Castellane y Fernández Anchorena (b. Paris 19 February 1927 - d. 11 December 2010), whom he married in Paris on 14 April 1948 (divorced 1974). They had two sons and one daughter.

His second wife was HRH Princess Joan of Luxembourg, née Joan Douglas Dillon (b. New York City, 31 January 1935). She was the widow of Prince Charles of Luxembourg (a son of Charlotte, Grand Duchess of Luxembourg), whom she married in Sutton Park, Surrey, on 1 March 1967, the former wife of James Brady Moseley (New York City, 22 May 1931 – Boston, Massachusetts, 9 April 1998), son of wealthy Boston stockbroker Frederick S. Moseley, Jr. and wife Jane H. Brady, whom she married firstly in Paris on 1 August 1953, divorced in Washoe County, Nevada on 12 December 1955 and annulled in Rome on 22 June 1963. She was the daughter of U.S. Treasury Secretary C. Douglas Dillon and his wife, Phyllis Chess Ellsworth. They married at Islesboro, Maine, on 3 August 1978, without issue. By this marriage, the Duc de Mouchy had a stepson and two stepdaughters.

Through his great-grandmother, Princess Anne Murat, Philippe descended from Napoleon I's Marshal, Joachim Murat, King of Naples, and Caroline Bonaparte, Napoleon's sister. Anne was married to Antoine de Noailles, 6th Duc de Mouchy, 6th Prince-Duc de Poix, Philippe's great-grandfather.

Children
 Nathalie Marie Thérèse de Noailles (born Neuilly 11 February 1949), married civilly in Paris 25 April 1981 and religiously in Nançay 23 May 1981 (divorced 1989) Christian Charles Meissirel-Marquot (born Bayonne 27 August 1945)
 Antoine-Georges-Marie de Noailles, Duc de Mouchy et de Poix in 2011 (born Paris 7 September 1950); married Saint-Hilarion 20 June 1980 Isabelle Marie Jeanne Hélène Frisch de Fels (born Neuilly 29 May 1955)
 Mélanie de Noailles (born Paris 11 September 1981)
 Charles de Noailles, styled Prince de Poix (born Paris 15 February 1984) heir to his father's titles
 Adrien de Noailles (born Paris 10 May 1985)
 Alexis de Noailles (Paris 5 September 1952 - Paris 14 September 2014), married Paris 6 September 2004 Princess Diane d'Orléans (born Neuilly 24 June 1970) daughter of Prince Jacques and Princess Gersende, Duke and Duchess of Orléans
 Céline de Noailles (born 14 January 2005)
 Léontine de Noailles (born 2006)
 Victoire de Noailles

References

External links
 Ancestry of Joan Douglas Dillon
 7mo Duque De Mouchy, Príncipe Duc De Poix Philippe François Armand Marie de Noailles

108
Philippe Francois Armand Marie
1922 births
2011 deaths
Cornell family
French people of American descent
French people of Irish descent